Frontenac is a municipality in Le Granit Regional County Municipality in Estrie, Quebec, Canada, on the Canada–United States border. Its population was 1,650 as of the Canada 2011 Census.

Toponymy
The area was settled heavily from 1870 to 1880 by colonizers from the United Kingdom and the United States. As such, it was known until 1959 as the united counties of Spaulding and Ditchfield (cantons unis de Spaulding-et-Ditchfield). The municipality was renamed in honour of Louis de Buade de Frontenac, a governor general of New France who played a significant role in the development of the colony. Today's population is predominantly French-speaking.

See also

 Zec Louise-Gosford

References

Commission de toponymie du Québec
Ministère des Affaires municipales, des Régions et de l'Occupation du territoire

External links

Municipalities in Quebec
Incorporated places in Estrie
Le Granit Regional County Municipality